Nicolas Baldo (born 10 June 1984 in Issoire) is a French former professional cyclist.

Major results

2006
 1st Overall Circuit des Trois Provinces
1st Stage 2
 1st Stage 2 Tour des Pays de Savoie
 10th Chrono Champenois
2008
 1st Stage 4 Tour Nivernais Morvan
2009
 1st Stage 4 Giro della Regione Friuli Venezia Giulia
 8th Overall Circuit des Ardennes
 10th Duo Normand (with Sébastien Harbonnier)
2010
 2nd Overall Rhône-Alpes Isère Tour
 2nd La Roue Tourangelle
 6th Overall Circuit des Ardennes
 10th Chrono Champenois
2011
 4th Chrono Champenois
 9th Overall Tour du Gévaudan Languedoc-Roussillon
2012
 1st  Overall An Post Rás
1st Stage 6
2013
 1st Paris–Mantes-en-Yvelines
 4th Overall Tour du Gévaudan Languedoc-Roussillon
 5th Tour de Berne
 6th Overall Rhône-Alpes Isère Tour
1st Stage 1
 7th Tour du Jura
 9th Chrono des Nations
2014
 2nd Overall Czech Cycling Tour
1st  Mountains classification
 4th Tour du Jura
 9th Chrono des Nations
2015
 1st Paris–Mantes-en-Yvelines
 6th Raiffeisen Grand Prix
 8th Grand Prix des Marbriers
2017
 4th Grand Prix d'Isbergues

References

External links

1984 births
Living people
French male cyclists
Rás Tailteann winners